Woolwich is a district of London, England.

Woolwich may also refer to:

Places
 Woolwich, London, England, and its local features or administrative areas:
 Woolwich (parish)
 Woolwich (UK Parliament constituency), now incorporated in Greenwich and Woolwich
 Metropolitan Borough of Woolwich, a former London borough 1899-1965
 Royal Military Academy, Woolwich
 Woolwich Common
 Woolwich Dockyard
 Woolwich Arsenal station
 Woolwich railway station
 Woolwich Dockyard railway station
 Woolwich Ferry
 Woolwich foot tunnel
 Woolwich, Ontario, Canada 
 Woolwich, Maine, United States of America
 Woolwich, New South Wales, Australia
 Woolwich Township, New Jersey, United States of America
 North Woolwich, London, England
 North Woolwich, Ontario, Canada

Geologic formations
 Woolwich-and-Reading Beds, geological deposits in southern England
 Woolwich Formation, in southeast England

People
 Madlyn-Ann C. Woolwich (born 1937), American pastel painter and author 
 Bishop of Woolwich, an office in the Anglican church

Organizations
 The Woolwich, a former British bank, previously a building society
 Woolwich Polytechnic (disambiguation)
 Woolwich Steam Packet Company
 Woolwich Boys, a drug-trafficking gang

Other uses
 HMS Woolwich, the name of nine ships of the Royal Navy
 Woolwich Equitable Building Society v IRC [1993] AC 70, a judicial decision of the House of Lords
 Woolwich beheading, the murder of Lee Rigby

See also

 
 Woolrich (disambiguation)